The 2021 Cure Bowl was a college football bowl game played on December 17, 2021, at Exploria Stadium in Orlando, Florida. The seventh edition of the Cure Bowl, the game featured the Northern Illinois Huskies of the Mid-American Conference and the Coastal Carolina Chanticleers of the Sun Belt Conference. The game began at 6:00 p.m. EST and aired on ESPN2. It was one of the 2021–22 bowl games concluding the 2021 FBS football season. Sponsored by digital marketplace Tailgreeter, the game was officially known as the Tailgreeter Cure Bowl. 

Northern Illinois entered the game with a 9–4 record while Coastal Carolina entered with a 10–2 record. Northern Illinois came into the game following a win in the 2021 MAC Championship Game. Coastal Carolina would enter the game with a two game winning streak. Coastal Carolina was favored to win the game, as they entered the game favored to win by 9.5 points. The game was expected to be a close game between Northern Illinois's and Coastal Carolina's rushing offenses, both of which finished top ten in the FBS.

On the first drive of the game, Northern Illinois would score a touchdown. This would be the first of eight straight drives that resulted in scores. The first possession of the game not to result in a score was the last drive of the first half, where half time prematurely ended the possession. Northern Illinois would lead at half time by seven points. The second half started by four straight touchdown drives. With 0:54 to go in the third quarter, Coastal Carolina punted for the first time in the game by either team. Northern Illinois would respond with a field goal that would be their last score of the game. Coastal Carolina would score two more touchdowns and force a turnover on downs and fumble. On the last possession of the game, Northern Illinois would advance to Coastal Carolina's five yard line before time ran out. Coastal Carolina defeated Northern Illinois 47–41, to claim their first bowl win in program history.

Teams
Consistent with conference tie-ins, the game featured the Northern Illinois Huskies from the Mid-American Conference and the Coastal Carolina Chanticleers from the Sun Belt Conference; the bowl has an additional tie-in with the American Athletic Conference that was not used. This was the first meeting ever between the two teams. This was Northern Illinois' first appearance in the Cure Bowl and its 14th bowl appearance overall, while Coastal Carolina made its second Cure Bowl appearance, having lost the 2020 edition, which was also its only other bowl appearance in program history.

Northern Illinois Huskies

After compiling a record of 0–6 in the pandemic-shortened 2020 season, the Northern Illinois Huskies achieved a dramatic turnaround in 2021, finishing the season as the champions of the Mid-American Conference. The Huskies began their season with an upset victory against Georgia Tech, winning off of a two-point conversion with less than a minute remaining in the game. NIU was not able to keep up the momentum; they fell in their next two games, against Wyoming and No. 25 Michigan. From there, Northern Illinois began a streak of five consecutive wins that saw them achieve bowl eligibility by the end of October. The Huskies defeated Maine and Eastern Michigan, the latter on homecoming, before hitting the road to beat Toledo. They returned home, defeating Bowling Green, before beating Central Michigan to secure their place in a bowl. NIU suffered their third loss to begin the month of November; they fell on the road against Kent State, but rebounded with wins against Ball State and Buffalo. They concluded their regular season with a loss to Western Michigan, but they had already secured their place in the 2021 MAC Championship Game, where they defeated Kent State in a rematch the following week to win the MAC Championship. Northern Illinois accepted its Cure Bowl bid the following day, on December 5, 2021; it entered with a record of 9–4 and a 6–2 record in conference play.

Coastal Carolina Chanticleers

Game summary

Statistics

References

External links
 Game statistics at statbroadcast.com

Cure Bowl
Cure Bowl
Coastal Carolina Chanticleers football bowl games
Northern Illinois Huskies football bowl games
Cure Bowl
Cure Bowl